In the Cárcel Modelo massacre, at the outset of the Spanish Civil War, a group of anarchist militiamen occupied the Madrid prison on August 22, 1936, and killed about 30 politicians and soldiers held there. After rumours that the prisoners, who were suspected political and military supporters of the 1936 military uprising, were escaping, an angry throng assembled at the prison's gates and demanded the execution of the "fascists".

A group of anarchist militiamen took control of the prison and that night executed well-known politicians and soldiers. The reputation of the republican government faltered from its inability to quell the crowd and protect the prisoners. The incident sparked protests from the diplomatic corps in Madrid.

See also 
 Badajoz massacre
 Málaga–Almería road massacre
 Montjuïc trial, 1896 torture of anarchist suspects in Barcelona
 Paracuellos massacres

References

Bibliography 

 
 
 
 
 
 
 
 
 
 
 
 

Political violence in Spain
Spanish Civil War massacres
People killed by the Second Spanish Republic
Prisons in Spain
Prison massacres
1930s in Madrid
1936 in Spain
Mass murder in 1936
1936 murders in Europe
Red Terror (Spain)